Human foamy virus (HFV) is a retrovirus and specifically belongs to the genus Spumavirus.  The spumaviruses are complex and significantly different from the other six genera of retroviruses in several ways.  The foamy viruses derive their name from the characteristic ‘foamy’ appearance of the cytopathic effect (CPE) induced in the cells.
Foamy virus in humans occurs only as a result of zoonotic infection.

Discovery
The first description of foamy virus (FV) was in 1954.  It was found as a contaminant in primary monkey kidney cultures.  The first isolate of the “foamy viral agent” was in 1955.  Not too long after this, it was isolated from a wide variety of New and Old World monkeys, cats, and cows.  It was not until several years later that humans entered the scene.  In 1971, a viral agent with FV-like characteristics was isolated from lymphoblastoid cells released from a human nasopharyngeal carcinoma (NPC) from a Kenyan patient.  The agent was termed a human FV because of its origin, and named SFVcpz(hu) as the prototypic laboratory strain.  The SFV came from its similarity to simian foamy virus (SFV). Not long after this, a group of researchers concluded that it was a distinct type of FV and most closely related to SFV types 6 and 7, both of which were isolated from chimpanzees. In another report, however, a different group of researchers claimed that SFVcpz(hu) was not a distinct type of FV but rather a variant strain of chimpanzee FV.  The debate came to an end in 1994 when the virus was cloned and sequenced.  The sequencing showed that there are 86–95% identical amino acids between the SFV and the one isolated from the Kenyan patient.  In addition, phylogenetic analysis showed that the pol regions of the two genomes shared 89–92% of their nucleotides and 95–97% of the amino acids are identical between the human virus and various SFV strains.  These results indicated that SFVcpz(hu) is likely a variant of SFV and not a unique isolate. When looking at the origin of the human FV, sequence comparisons showed that from four different species of chimpanzees, SFVcpz(hu) was most closely related to the Eastern chimpanzee. This subspecies has a natural habitat in Kenya and thus was most likely the origin of this SFV variant, and the virus was probably acquired as a zoonotic infection.

Life cycle
Most of the differences between the spumaviruses and the other retroviruses come from the life cycle.  Some of the main differences are that FV buds from the endoplasmic reticulum instead of the plasma membrane; this difference gives FV a unique morphology.  FV is characterized by an immature looking core with an electron lucent center with glycoprotein spikes on the surface.  FV replication more closely resembles the Hepadnaviridae, which are another family of reverse transcriptase encoding viruses.  Reverse transcription of the genome occurs at a later step in the replication cycle, which results in the infectious particles having DNA rather than RNA, this also leads to less integration in the host genome.  The DNA found is linear and the length of the genome.  The genome encodes the usual retroviral genes pol, gag, and env as well as two additional genes tas or bel-1 and bet.  The role for bet is not quite clear, research has shown that it is dispensable for replication of the virus in tissue culture. Recently, a novel mechanism was reported where foamy virus accessory protein Bet (unlike HIV-1 Vif) impaired the cytoplasmic solubility of APOBEC3G. The tas gene, however, is required for replication.  It encodes a protein that functions in transactivating the long terminal repeat (LTR) promoter.  FV has a second promoter, the internal promoter (IP) which is located in the env gene.  The IP drives expression of the tas and bet genes.  The IP is also unique in that the virus has the capacity to transcribe mRNAs from it; usually the complex retroviruses exclusively express transcripts from the LTR.  The structural genes of FV are another one of its unique features.  The Gag protein is not efficiently cleaved into the mature virus which lends to the immature morphology.  The Pol precursor protein is only partially cleaved; the integrase domain is removed by viral protease.  As in other retroviruses, the Env protein is cleaved into surface and transmembrane domains but the FV Env protein also contains an endoplasmic reticulum retention signal which is part of why the virus buds from the endoplasmic reticulum.  Another area of difference between FV and other retroviruses is the possibility of recycling the core once the virus is in the cell.

Diseases
Persistence in the absence of disease, but in the presence of antibodies is a defining characteristic of FV infection.  HFV has been isolated from patients with various neoplastic and degenerative diseases such as myasthenia gravis, multiple sclerosis, De Quervain's thyroiditis, and Graves’ disease but the virus’ etiological role is still unclear. Recent studies indicate that it is not pathogenic in humans and experimentally infected animals.

Implications 
If, in fact, HFV is not pathogenic in humans and is a retrovirus, it is an ideal vector for gene therapy.  Another important feature of the virus is that the Gag, Pol, and Env proteins are synthesized independently; this is important because it means that each protein can be provided in trans on three different plasmids to create a stable packaging cell line. Having this would possibly reduce the need for a replication-competent helper virus.  Other advantages are human to human transmission has never been reported, it has a safer spectrum of insertional mutagenesis than other retroviruses, and since there are two promoters in the genome, it may be possible to make a vector that expresses the foreign genes under the control of both promoters.  A disadvantage of HFV as a gene therapy vector is that since it buds from an intracellular membrane (endoplasmic reticulum membrane); it results in low extracellular titers of the viral vector.

References

External links
 

Spumaviruses